The Upper American Fork Hydroelectric Power Plant Historic District is a  historic district in American Fork Canyon in northeastern Utah County, Utah, United States, that is listed on the National Register of Historic Places (NRHP).

Description
The district consists of one contributing building and three contributing structures.

The district was listed on the NRHP on April 20, 1989.

See also

National Register of Historic Places listings in Utah County, Utah

References

External links

Industrial buildings and structures on the National Register of Historic Places in Utah
Industrial buildings completed in 1906
Historic districts in Utah County, Utah
Hydroelectricity in the United States
Historic districts on the National Register of Historic Places in Utah
National Register of Historic Places in Utah County, Utah
1906 establishments in Utah